Napachanie  (German Grundheim) is a village and sołectwo in the administrative district of Gmina Rokietnica, within Poznań County, Greater Poland Voivodeship, in west-central Poland. The village has a population of 460.

It has a junior high school (gimnazjum) and a palace from 1879, built in the style of Queen Anna's North-European Renaissance.

Napachanie was the birthplace of Antoni of Napachanie (1494–1561), professor and rector of the University of Kraków.

References

Napachanie